The Bagienni (or Vegenni or Vagienni) were an ancient Ligurian people of north-western Italy mentioned in Pliny the Elder’s Naturalis Historia. They were based in various areas of what is today south-western Piedmont, but particularly in the upper part of the Tanaro valley. They were also present in the Val Trebbia in today's Emilia Romagna. Their capital, known to the Ancient Romans as Augusta Bagiennorum, was located in the frazione Roncaglia of Bene Vagienna in the modern Province of Cuneo.

The Bagienni were conquered by the Romans around the middle of the second century BC, their territories becoming part of Roman Italy.

References

History of Piedmont
Ligures
Tribes conquered by the Roman Republic
Tribes conquered by Rome